Sir Alfred Chester Beatty (7 February 1875 – 19 January 1968)Seanad 1985: "Chester Beatty died at the Princess Grace Clinic, Monte Carlo, on 19 January 1968, [...]" (some sources give this as 20 January). was an American-British mining magnate and philanthropist. A successful businessman, Beatty was given the epithet "the King of Copper" in reference to his fortune. He became a naturalised British citizen in 1933, was knighted in 1954 and was made an honorary citizen of Ireland in 1957.

He collected African, Asian, European and Middle Eastern manuscripts, rare printed books, prints and objets d'art. After moving to Dublin in 1950, he established the Chester Beatty Library on Shrewsbury Road to house his collection; it opened to the public in 1954. The collections were bequeathed to the Irish people and entrusted to the care of the state in his Irish will. He donated several papyrus documents to the British Museum, his second wife's (Edith Dunn Beatty) collection of Marie Antoinette's personal furniture to the Louvre and a number of his personal paintings that once hung in the picture gallery of his London home to the National Gallery of Ireland. He also made possible the expansion and relocation of the Cancer Research Institute, which was renamed the Chester Beatty Institute, and later renamed the Institute of Cancer Research, in 1939.

Early life
A. Chester Beatty, known to friends and family as Chester or "Chet", was born into a middle-class New York family in 1875 on the site of what is now Rockefeller Center, the youngest of three sons, Chester, Robert and Gedney. He was born to Hetty and John Beatty, a banker and stockbroker.

He graduated from Columbia School of Mines in 1898 and bought a one-way train ticket to Denver, Colorado. His first job in the mines earned him $2 per day as a "mucker", clearing away rock and soil from mine tunnels. He was quickly promoted to supervisor of the Kektonga Silver Mine.

His first mentor was T. A. Rickard, a mining engineer. Rickard also introduced Beatty to his sister-in-law, Grace "Ninette" Rickard, whom Beatty married in Denver in 1900. In 1903 he joined John Hayes Hammond on the management team of the Guggenheim Exploration Company. This position soon made Beatty wealthy. In 1908, when he left the Guggenheims, he was regarded as one of the country's leading mining engineers.

He bought a house in the East Side of New York and set up an office on Broadway as an independent mining consultant. Ninette and their daughter (little Ninette) joined him during the summer of 1907, and in October their son, Chester Jr, was born.

In 1911, Grace died suddenly of typhoid fever. In 1912 he purchased Baroda House in Kensington Palace Gardens and moved with his two young children to London the following year. Shortly after the move, he married his second wife, Edith Dunn, in the Kensington Registry Office. He and Edith were both avid collectors.

In 1914, Beatty founded the London-based mining company, Selection Trust. The First World War delayed the company's expansion, but during the 1920s the business expanded to acquire interests in countries including the USSR, the Gold Coast (present-day Ghana) and the Colony and Protectorate of Sierra Leone.

Beatty made his fortune in Northern Rhodesia (present-day Zambia) and the Belgian Congo (present-day Democratic Republic of Congo), where he exploited the Copper Belt. For this, he became known as the "King of Copper".

Collector

An early family anecdote recalls that, as a young boy, Chester caught the collection bug, bidding at auction for mining samples. He recalled attending an auction with his father at the age of ten, and bidding 10 cents on a piece of pink calcite. During his time in Denver he began collecting stamps, which grew into an award-winning collection. Before his move to London he had already started collecting Chinese snuff bottles and Japanese netsuke, inro and tsuba.

Due to a condition of the lungs called silicosis, which he had acquired through his years working in American mines, Beatty and his family would winter in Egypt, until the outbreak of World War II, and after the war in the south of France. During his first trip to Cairo in the winter of 1913/14, he became interested in papyrus and Islamic manuscripts.

In 1931 an announcement in The Times cast Beatty as a great collector. He had acquired an important collection of Biblical manuscripts, now known as the Chester Beatty Biblical Papyri. The discovery changed the existing understanding of pre-Constantinian textual history. With the New Testament books – Gospels and Acts (BP I), Pauline Epistles (BP II) and Revelation (BP III) – all dated to the third century, these documents were not only were surprising for having survived the Diocletian persecutions at the beginning of the next century, but the dating moved New Testament scholarship back by at least one hundred years. The dating specifically of BP I (p45) to the mid-third century moved the understanding of when Christians accepted the four gospels as canonical to earlier than had previously been presumed.

In 1917, recovering from a bout of pneumonia and Spanish influenza, Beatty, Edith and his daughter Ninette, traveled by boat to Japan and China. During this trip he acquired painted albums and scrolls and he continued to purchase Chinese, Japanese and south-east Asian manuscripts, textiles and artefacts for the rest of his life.

Beatty's reputation as a collector grew, and so did his network of advisers and agents. As in his business life, Beatty relied on the advice of experienced specialists but made the final decision on any purchase himself. By this time Edith was also establishing herself as a serious collector in her own right. While she was buying Impressionist and Post-Impressionist paintings and French furniture, Beatty was acquiring important Islamic material, including an exceptional collection of illuminated copies of the Quran, and Mughal, Turkish and Persian manuscripts. His Western holdings were enhanced by acquisitions of Coptic, Syriac, Armenian and Greek manuscripts. To his Asian holdings he added Tibetan, Thai, Burmese and Sumatran manuscripts. His eye was drawn to richly illustrated material, fine bindings and beautiful calligraphy, but he was also deeply committed to preserving texts for their historic value. He concerned himself only with works of the finest quality, and this became the hallmark of his collection.

Initially Beatty was a competitive force in the burgeoning Orientalist art market of the early 20th century. The major library and museum institutions anticipated his presence when prospecting acquisitions. However, in 1925, Beatty began what would later become a robust partnership with the British Museum. Though in later cases he would purchase an object and simply donate it, for the manuscript now known as the Minto Album, Beatty amicably agreed to split the folios. The lot was sold to Sir Eric Maclagan, Director of the British Museum, as part of a joint-purchase agreement with Beatty for $3,950. Beatty had first pick of the folios, the museum bought the remainder for $2000, and Beatty charitably donated an additional folio. The Beattys were also patrons of the British Museum, donating 19 ancient Egyptian papyri to the Museum.

Between 1939 and 1949, Beatty acquired over 140 nineteenth-century paintings to display in the picture gallery of his London home. The gallery had been built as a result of the conversion of the stables to a library in 1934; the gallery linked the main house to the garden library. In 1940, Beatty packed up the paintings and shipped them to New York for safekeeping during the Second World War. In 1949, Beatty decided to donate part of his collection of French nineteenth-century paintings to the Irish nation as a token of appreciation to the Taoiseach of the day, John A. Costello, for his support in facilitating Beatty's move from London. These are now part of the collection of the National Gallery of Ireland.

Move to Dublin
Beatty had supported the war effort, contributing a large amount of raw materials to the Allies. He received a belated knighthood by Queen Elizabeth II in the 1954 Birthday Honours List for his contribution to the wartime effort.

By the late 1940s, however, he had become disillusioned with Britain. Political deviations from his free-market values, coupled with increased foreign exchange restrictions impacted both his personal and collecting interests in Britain. Though he had initially envisioned deepening his relationship with the British Museum by donating his collection in its entirety (he had personally funded many of the museum acquisitions, and received expert consultations from the curators), he changed his mind when the new director insisted on deciding for himself whether Beatty's collection met the museum's quality standards. The director also would not assure Beatty that his collection would remain intact, rather than being parceled out to different departments.

He bought a large townhouse for himself on Ailesbury Road in the Ballsbridge area of Dublin, and a site on nearby Shrewsbury Road, also in Ballsbridge, for the construction of the Chester Beatty Library. The library, which housed his collection, opened on 8 August 1953. It was moved to its current location at Dublin Castle in 2000.

Beatty spent the remainder of his life between Dublin and the south of France. He was made a Freeman of Dublin in 1954 and was the first person granted honorary citizenship of Ireland in 1957. He continued to collect in the 1950s and 1960s, acquiring important Ethiopian manuscripts and Japanese printed material during that period.

Beatty died in Monte Carlo in Monaco in 1968; his Irish estate was valued at £7 million. He was accorded a state funeral by the Irish government – the first private citizen in Irish history to receive such an honour. He is buried in Glasnevin Cemetery in Dublin.

The Chester Beatty Library on Shrewsbury Road and the collection it housed was bequeathed to a trust on behalf of the people of Ireland. In 2000, it opened in its current location: the eighteenth-century Clock Tower building in the grounds of Dublin Castle.

Footnotes

References

External links
 CBL.ie – Chester Beatty Library website
 Obituary  - Northern Mine Research Society

1875 births
1968 deaths
American emigrants to England
American emigrants to Ireland
American mining businesspeople
British art collectors
British emigrants to Ireland
British book and manuscript collectors
British mining businesspeople
Burials at Glasnevin Cemetery
Businesspeople awarded knighthoods
Columbia School of Mines alumni
Irish art collectors
Irish expatriates in Monaco
20th-century Irish philanthropists
Knights Bachelor
Naturalised citizens of the United Kingdom